Lee You-jin (born April 6, 1992) is a South Korean actor. He is best known for his role as Kwon Ho-chang in the 2017 television series Hello, My Twenties! 2, and the 2019 drama Be Melodramatic.

Career
Lee You-jin participated in Namoo Actors's "Introduction to Rookies" fan meeting on July 8, 2017 alongside Oh Seung-hoon and Song Kang. Tickets sold out within 30 seconds.

Personal life
Lee's father is actor Lee Hyo-jung, and actor Lee Ki-young is his paternal uncle.

Filmography

Film

Television series

Web series

Variety show

Music video appearances

Stage

Awards and nominations

References

External links

 Lee You-jin at Namoo Actors 
 
 

Living people
South Korean male television actors
South Korean male film actors
Dongguk University alumni
Produce 101 contestants
1992 births